Ralstonism was a social movement in the United States in the 19th century. It claimed about 800,000 followers. Ralstonism was the brainchild of Webster Edgerly (1852–1926). In Edgerly's words, "Ralstonism is the grandest movement that man is capable of establishing".

Ralstonism began as the Ralston Health Club, which published Edgerly's writings. It was a hierarchical organization where members were ranked according to the number of "degrees" they had, which ranged from 0 to 100. Members advanced five degrees at a time, and each Ralston book that a member purchased counted as five degrees.

Although Edgerly claimed in the 1900 edition of The Book of General Membership of the Ralston Health Club that the letters for the word RALSTON came from Regime, Activity, Light, Strength, Temperation, Oxygen and Nature, earlier editions of the same book are credited to Everett Ralston, a pseudonym of Edgerly, with the implication that Ralstonism is named after this fictitious person.

Edgerly saw his followers as the founding members of a new race, based on Caucasians, and free from "impurities". He advocated the castration of all "anti-racial" (non-Caucasian) males at birth.

Edgerly wrote 82 of what would today be called self-help books under the pseudonym Edmund Shaftesbury. They covered subjects including diet, exercise, punctuation, sexual magnetism, artistic deep breathing, facial expressions and ventriloquism. Although Edgerly publicly claimed that the Ralston Company had no goods for sale, he did sell his books through mail order. Many of these books are still available through old-books dealers.

In addition to advice like toothbrushing, the books make various recommendations, for example that every young man should engage in a form of probationary marriage with a woman old enough to be his grandmother. Edgerly also created his own language, called the Adam-Man-Tongue, with a 33-letter alphabet.

The Magnetism Club of America, another Ralstonite organization, was founded to give its members mind control.

Ralstonites were to follow strict dietary guidelines. For example, watermelons were supposed to be poisonous to Caucasians. Correct diet and proper physical exercise would help readers attain personal magnetism, which would give them control over the thoughts of others. Much of the physical regime demanded moving in graceful curves and arcs and walking exclusively on the balls of one's feet. Because sudden starts and stops and sharp angular movements caused a "leakage of vital force", Ralstonites were to even pick marbles in continuous circles. There was a proper way to bathe (dry bath), gesture, sit, stand, sleep, talk and have sex. Edgerly claimed a scientific basis for all this.

In 1900 Edgerly joined forces with the founder of Purina Food Company, which took the name Ralston Purina Company (which would later become Nestlé Purina PetCare). It made whole wheat cereal that Ralstonites were to consume. The food company Edgerly founded evolved into what is now called Ralcorp which was the original manufacturer of cereal brands including Chex and Cookie Crisp.

Between 1894 and 1895, Edgerly bought large areas of farmland along the northern slope of Hopewell Valley, New Jersey, where he founded Ralston Heights in 1905. A house he designed was built to contain a community of Ralstonites he meant to be a core of a future City of Ralston. The contours of the estate followed Edgerly's conviction that sudden stops and walking in straight lines would cause leakage of vital force. Edgerly planned to expand to hundreds of lots, sixteen small farms, seven palaces and a Temple of Ralston. This community did not materialize, at least not in the form Edgerly intended. Much of the estate still exists, albeit in ruined condition.

In 2020, a fiction novel entitled, "Ralston Heights," was published by James Betz, an author from nearby Pennington, NJ. Albeit supernatural horror, Betz' story was influenced by Webster Edgerly's Hopewell Valley residence along with the Ralstonism movement.

References

External links
 Writings of Webster Edgerly at oddbooks.com
Life building method of the Ralston Health Club; "All nature" course at archive.org
Book of general membership of the Ralston Health Club at archive.org
Magnetism Manual of the Magnetism Club of America (archived) (formerly at neurolinguistic.com)
 at google.com 

Health movements
Diets
Social movements in the United States
Social philosophy
Pseudoscience
Ralston Purina
Eugenics organizations
White supremacist groups in the United States